Transformers: EarthSpark is an American computer-animated television series based on the Transformers toyline by Hasbro and Takara Tomy and developed by Dale Malinowski, Ant Ward and Nicole Dubuc for the streaming service Paramount+ and the cable channel Nickelodeon. The series is owned and distributed by Hasbro, and is a co-production between Hasbro's Entertainment One and Nickelodeon Animation Studio, with animation services provided by Icon Creative Studio. It debuted on Paramount+ with its first 10 episodes on November 11, 2022.

The second batch of episodes of season one, bringing the total episode count to eighteen, began streaming on Paramount+ on March 3, 2023. The series has been renewed for a second season.

Premise
Fifteen years after the end of the civil war between the Autobots and the Decepticons where the destruction of the Space Bridge strands both Transformers, the Malto family relocates from Philadelphia to the small town of Witwicky, Pennsylvania. There, young Robby and Mo Malto witness the birth of a new breed of Earth-born Transformers called Terrans, who become emotionally-bonded to the two via special cyber-sleeves on their arms. Now adopted into the family and being mentored by Bumblebee, the Terrans work with the Autobots, the former Decepticon leader Megatron, the organization G.H.O.S.T., and the children to protect their new life from the remaining rogue Decepticons and other villains while finding their place in the world.

Characters

Terrans
 Twitch Malto (voiced by Kathreen Khavari) – An inquisitive and competitive Terran Transformer and Robby's partner. She transforms into a flying Cybertronian drone.
 Thrash Malto (voiced by Zeno Robinson) – A fun-loving and impulsive Terran Transformer and Mo's partner. He transforms into a motorcycle with a sidecar.
 Hashtag Malto (voiced by Stephanie Lemelin) – An excitable media-savvy second-generation Terran Transformer. She transforms into a G.H.O.S.T. surveillance van.
 Jawbreaker Malto (voiced by Cyrus Arnold) – A sensitive second-generation Terran Transformer.
 Nightshade Malto (voiced by Z Infante) – A creative and scientifically-minded second-generation Terran Transformer. Nightshade is the first character in a Transformers cartoon to be identified as non-binary. They transform into a Northern hawk-owl.

Autobots
 Optimus Prime (voiced by Alan Tudyk) – The leader of the Autobots. He transforms into a semi-trailer truck.
 Bumblebee (voiced by Danny Pudi) – An Autobot scout who becomes the Terrans' mentor. He transforms into a yellow sports car with black racing stripes, though it was shown he originally scanned a similarly colored compact car.
 Elita-1 (voiced by Cissy Jones) – The Autobots' second-in-command. She transforms into an all-terrain SUV.
 Wheeljack (voiced by Michael T. Downey) – An Autobot mechanic and scientist. He transforms into a rally car. Wheeljack was responsible for the drones that were scanned by Twitch who would later nickname him "Dad 2".
 Arcee (voiced by Martha Marion) – An Autobot soldier. She transforms into a muscle car.
 Grimlock (voiced by Keith David) – A Dinobot warrior who transforms into a Tyrannosaurus.

Decepticons
 Megatron (voiced by Rory McCann) – The former leader of the Decepticons who has renounced his evil ways and has occasionally collaborated with Dorothy Malto. He transforms into an armored tiltrotor. Megatron's renouncing of his evil ways have put him at odds with some of the Decepticons.
 Swindle and Hardtop (both voiced by Nolan North) – A pair of criminal Decepticon brothers. They transform into an SUV and a dune buggy respectively. Swindle was detained and Hardtop's right arm was modified by Mandroid into a prosthetic replacement for his own. When Mandroid got away after his first fight with the Autobots, Hardtop was among those detained as he claims to Megatron that he was not himself. Swindle would later try to dupe Thrash and Mo into helping find Hardtop by stealing the Energon Scanner only to be repelled by Bumblebee.
 Skullcruncher  – A Croctobot who is in the possession of Mandroid and can transform into a crocodile. He was later put into G.H.O.S.T. custody after his defeat by the Maltos and Autobots.
 Soundwave (voiced by Sean Kenin) – A Decepticon who works with his cassette-bots minions. He transforms into a stealth Cybertronian aircraft and has a particular grudge against Megatron for renouncing his evil ways.
 Ravage - One of Soundwave's mini-cassette minions, taking on a cat-like robot mode.
 Laserbeak (voiced by Jake Green) - One of Soundwave's mini-cassette minions, taking on a bird-like robot mode. He is the MC at the underground fight ring where Grimlock fights. 
 Frenzy (voiced by Tiana Camacho) - One of Soundwave's mini-cassette minions, and the only one with a traditionally humanoid robot mode. She is the only one of the mini-cassettes to have dialogue and can understand Ravage.
 Starscream (voiced by Steve Blum) – A Decepticon who transforms into a jet, formerly serving as the faction's Air Commander in the great war. After the war ended, Starscream was seen in the custody of G.H.O.S.T. by the time Soundwave was incarcerated. Blum reprises his role from Transformers: Prime and Robots in Disguise.
 Skywarp and Nova Storm (both voiced by Nicole Dubuc) – A pair of Decepticon Seekers forced to work for Mandroid. They both transform into jets. Skywarp can teleport.
 Tarantulas (voiced by Alfie Allen) – A Predacon scientist who transforms into a spider. Residing under a Witwicky cemetery, Tarantula wants to be left alone and is shown to be caring when it comes to protoforms. He even gives Nightshade some advice regarding alt-modes.
 Breakdown (voiced by Roger Craig Smith) – A Stunticon who is one of a few Decepticons to renounce his evil ways and is close friends with Bumblebee. He transforms into a race car.
 Shockwave (voiced by Troy Baker) – The Decepticons' former chief scientist who has a vendetta against Megatron. He transforms into a Cybertronian 4-legged walking tank.
 Brawl – A Decepticon who was forced to fight in an illegal Bot Brawl for Energon to survive. He was later found to have been drained of his Energon alongside the other captive Cybertronians. This was caused by Mandroid who took his left arm.

Insecticons
 Shrapnel – An Insecticon who is in the possession of Mandroid and can transform into a stag beetle. He was later put into G.H.O.S.T. custody after his defeat by the Maltos and the Autobots.
 Bombshell – An Insecticon who is in the possession of Mandroid and can transform into a Japanese rhinoceros beetle. He was later put into G.H.O.S.T. custody after his defeat by the Maltos and the Autobots.

Humans
 Robby Malto (voiced by Sydney Mikayla) – A 13-year-old boy adjusting to his new life after being forced to move to a small town.
 Morgan Violet "Mo" Malto (voiced by Zion Broadnax) – Robby's optimistic 9-year-old sister.
 Dorothy "Dot" Malto (voiced by Benni Latham) – Robby and Mo's mother, who is a park ranger and ex-soldier. In "Age Of Evolution" Pt. 1, it's revealed she has lost a leg in the great Cybertronian war.
 Dr. Alex Malto (portrayed by Jon Jon Briones) – Robby and Mo's father who is a college professor with a Ph.D. in Cybertronian History.
 Mandroid / Dr. Meridian (voiced by Diedrich Bader) – A mad scientist and roboticist who seeks to destroy all Cybertronians. His real name is Dr. Meridian and was given the nickname "Mandroid" against his wishes by Thrash. Mandroid had lost his original right arm in the Cybertronian war back when he used to work for G.H.O.S.T., and begins replacing his body parts with those of the Transformers he captures.
 Arachnamechs - The spider-like creations of Mandroid.
 Mr. Smelt (voiced by Daran Norris) – A teacher at Witwicky Charter School.

G.H.O.S.T.
Short for Global Hazard and Ordinance Strike Team, this human organization has the goals of rebuilding the relationship between the humans and the Cybertronians.

 Executive Agent Croft (voiced by Kari Wahlgren) – A high-ranking member of G.H.O.S.T.
 Agent Jon Schloder (voiced by Marc Evan Jackson) – A member of G.H.O.S.T. and the brother of Agent Croft.

Other characters
 Quintus Prime (voiced by Clancy Brown) – An ancient Cybertronian and one of the original Thirteen Primes created by Primus who serves as the scientist of the group. His artifact the Emberstone is responsible for bringing the Terrans into existence as he is shown to speak through it.

Episodes

Production
In early 2021, Hasbro announced two animated series based on the Transformers brand. The first was a series based on the BotBots line for Netflix, and the other was a then-untitled series set to air on Nickelodeon in 2022. The series' official title, Transformers: EarthSpark, was revealed in February 2022 with a release window set for the fall of that year. On February 1, 2023, the series was renewed for a second season.

Marketing
The voice cast and a sneak peek for the series was later revealed during the 2022 San Diego Comic-Con.

Release
On March 24, 2022, it was announced that the series would debut on the Paramount+ streaming service in November 2022. Nickelodeon previewed the premiere episodes early on the same day, but later started airing them on a regular schedule on February 3, 2023.

References

External links
 
 

Earthspark
2020s American animated television series
2020s American science fiction television series
2022 American television series debuts
American children's animated action television series
American children's animated space adventure television series
American children's animated comic science fiction television series
American children's animated science fantasy television series
American children's animated superhero television series
American computer-animated television series
English-language television shows
Paramount+ original programming
Paramount+ children's programming
Television series by Entertainment One
Television shows based on Takara Tomy toys
Television shows set in Pennsylvania
Nicktoons